Michael Cook (14 February 1933 – 1 July 1994) was a Canadian playwright known for his plays set in Newfoundland.

Early life
Cook was born in Fulham, London, England. He attended boarding schools until age fifteen. He served five years in the British Army, mostly in Asia including Japan where he saw the Ama (Japanese female free-divers) harvesting shellfish, sea urchins, pearls, etc, from the ocean, and later attended the University of Nottingham, earning teaching qualifications.  He then settled in Newfoundland in 1965.

Career
Soon after arriving in Newfoundland, Cook wrote scripts for several radio dramas which were produced in St. John's; Cook taught theatre arts at Memorial University of Newfoundland; he reviewed plays and wrote articles about the importance of theatre in the St. John's Evening Telegram and in the Canadian Theatrical Review. In the Fall and Spring semesters of 1974/75, he taught a first year English course at Memorial University of Newfoundland.

Cook wrote a number of plays set in Newfoundland, beginning with was Tiln, written in 1971.  His best-known works were Jacob's Wake and The Head, Guts and Soundbone Dance, in which Newfoundland provides a sometimes realistic and sometimes symbolic backdrop for his poetic rendering of lives in continual conflict with natural elements.

Many of Cook's plays include dialogue written in the Newfoundland dialect; in spite of this, The Head, Guts and Soundbone Dance was restaged as far away as Regina, Saskatchewan in 1980.

Personal life
Cook married three times, and fathered twelve children, including actor Sebastian Spence by his wife, Janis.
Cook retained a residence in Stratford, Ontario. While passing through St Johns on a trip to his summer home on Random Island, Cook became ill and died.

Plays
 Tiln, 1971.
 Colour The Flesh the Colour of Dust, 1972.
 The Head, Guts and Sound Bone Dance, 1973.
 Jacob's Wake, 1974.
 Quiller, 1975.
 Therese's Creed, 1976.
 The Fisherman's Revenge, 1976. (children's play)
 On The Rim of the Curve, 1977.
 The Gayden Chronicles, 1980.

Works about Michael Cook
 Craig Walker, "Michael Cook: Elegy, Allegory and Eschatology," The Buried Astrolabe: Canadian Dramatic Imagination and Western Tradition.  Montreal and Kingston: McGill-Queen's University Press, 2001.

References

External links
 Biography at Newfoundland and Labrador Heritage

1933 births
1994 deaths
English dramatists and playwrights
20th-century Canadian dramatists and playwrights
English emigrants to Canada
Writers from St. John's, Newfoundland and Labrador
People from Fulham
Canadian male dramatists and playwrights
English male dramatists and playwrights
20th-century Canadian male writers
20th-century English male writers